Pycnochromis is a genus belonging to the family Pomacentridae, the damselfishes and clownfishes, which is found in the Indian and Pacific Oceans.

Species
The following 24 species are classified within the genus Pycnochromis:

References

Chrominae
 
Taxa named by Henry Weed Fowler